Olena Sobchuk (born 23 November 1995) is a Ukrainian racewalking athlete. Representing Ukraine at the 2019 World Athletics Championships, she placed fourth in the women's 50 kilometres walk.

She competed in the women's 20 kilometres walk at the 2022 World Athletics Championships held in Eugene, Oregon, United States.

References

Ukrainian female racewalkers
1995 births
Living people
World Athletics Championships athletes for Ukraine
20th-century Ukrainian women
21st-century Ukrainian women
Universiade medalists in athletics (track and field)
Universiade silver medalists for Ukraine